Michael Carl Monuteaux (born March 21, 1974) is a senior epidemiologist and biostatistician in the Division of Emergency Medicine at Boston Children's Hospital, as well as an assistant professor of pediatrics at Harvard Medical School. He specializes in research on the prevention of violent injuries, especially those resulting from the use of firearms.  He graduated from Boston University and Harvard School of Public Health.

References

External links
Faculty page

1974 births
American epidemiologists
American emergency physicians
Harvard Medical School faculty
Living people
Biostatisticians
Gun violence researchers
American pediatricians
Boston University alumni
Harvard School of Public Health alumni